John Mitchell may refer to:

Arts
John Mitchell, American jazz banjoist who has worked with Johnny Dunn
John Mitchell, Canadian ice dancer in the 1962 World Figure Skating Championships
John Mitchell (composer) (born 1941), American composer
John Mitchell (minister) (1794–1870), American minister and author
John Mitchell (musician) (born 1973), lead singer and guitarist for UK band It Bites, and music producer
John Ames Mitchell (1844–1918), American illustrator
John Cameron Mitchell (born 1963), American filmmaker
John Campbell Mitchell (1861–1922), Scottish landscape artist
John Grant Mitchell (actor) (1874–1957), American character actor in the 1930s and 1940s
John Hanson Mitchell (born 1940), American author
John Mitch Mitchell (1946–2008), English musician
John R. Mitchell (poet) (1940–2006), poet and a professor of English
John W. Mitchell (1917–2005), British sound engineer
John Wendell Mitchell (1880–1951), Canadian author

Business
John Mitchell Jr. (1863–1929), editor of the Richmond Planet, a newspaper in Richmond, Virginia's Jackson Ward community
John Mitchell (United Mine Workers) (1870–1919), president of the United Mine Workers
John Francis Mitchell (1928–2009), vice chairman, Motorola; inventor of the mobile cell phone
John G. Mitchell (editor) (died 2007), American editor of National Geographic magazine
John J. Mitchell (banker) (1853–1927), Chicago-based banker, president of the Illinois Trust and Savings Bank
Jack Mitchell (banker) (1897–1985), American banker, co-founder of United Airlines

Military
 John Mitchell (born 1785), British Army officer and author
 John Mitchell (Medal of Honor), American Indian Wars soldier and Medal of Honor recipient, see Company I, 5th US Infantry
 John Mitchell (RAF officer) (1888–1964), RAF officer
 John G. Mitchell (general) (1838–1894), American Civil War general
 John J. Mitchell (Medal of Honor) (1846–1898), American Indian Wars soldier and Medal of Honor recipient, see Company L, 8th US Cavalry
 John K. Mitchell (1811–1889), Confederate Navy commander during the American Civil War, see 
 John Lewis Mitchell (1918–2016), RAF Air Commodore
 John R. C. Mitchell, United States naval aviator, see June 1955
 John W. Mitchell (United States Air Force) (1915–1995), US Air Force officer, flying ace and the leader of Operation Vengeance
 John Wesley Mitchell (1891–1969), Australian soldier
 John Merrill (Medal of Honor) (1846–1883), American Indian Wars soldier and Medal of Honor recipient

Politics

United States
John Mitchell (Pennsylvania politician) (1781–1849), United States Congressman from Pennsylvania
John Mitchell (United Mine Workers) (1870–1919), labor leader
John Mitchell Jr. (politician) or "Larry" (born 1954), American politician and member of the Delaware House of Representatives
John H. Mitchell (1835–1905), American politician and senator from Oregon
John H. Mitchell (Iowa politician) (1899–1992), Iowa state representative and attorney general
John I. Mitchell (1838–1907), United States Senator from Pennsylvania
John Joseph Mitchell (1873–1925), United States Representative from Massachusetts
John L. Mitchell (1842–1904), American politician from Wisconsin and father of Gen. Billy Mitchell
John M. Mitchell (1858–1905), United States Representative from New York
John N. Mitchell (1913–1988), United States Attorney General and Watergate conspirator
John Purroy Mitchel (1879–1918), mayor of New York
John Ridley Mitchell (1877–1962), United States Representative from Tennessee

Other countries
John Mitchel (1815–1875), Irish nationalist and politician
John Mitchell (Australian politician) (1869–1943), member of the Victorian Parliament
John Mitchell (Hull politician) (c. 1781–1859), Member of Parliament for Kingston-upon-Hull
John Mitchell (MP for Truro), British politician
John F. Mitchell (1862–1943), Canadian politician
John Matthew Mitchell (1925–2019), Assistant Director-General, British Council
John Thomas Whitehead Mitchell (1828–1895), British co-operative activist
John Walker Mitchell (1832–1914), Scottish-born New Zealand politician
John William Mitchell (1872–1952), mayor of Calgary, Alberta

Science
John Mitchell (geographer) (1711–1768), colonial American physician, botanist, and geographer
John Kearsley Mitchell (1798–1858), American physician
John Mitchell (physicist) (1913–2007), New Zealand born physicist
J. Murray Mitchell (1928–1990), American climatologist
John F. B. Mitchell (born 1948), British climatologist/climate modeller
John C. Mitchell, computer scientist
John Mitchell (chemist), American chemist and materials scientist

Sports

Baseball
John Mitchell (outfielder) (1937–2020), Negro league outfielder
John Mitchell (pitcher) (born 1965), Major League Baseball pitcher, 1986–1990
Johnny Mitchell (baseball) (1894–1965), baseball shortstop, 1921–1925

Ice hockey
John Mitchell (ice hockey, born 1895) (1895–1957), Canadian ice hockey player with the Regina Capitals and Duluth Hornets
John Mitchell (ice hockey, born 1985), National Hockey League player with the Colorado Avalanche

Other sports
John Mitchell (administrator), president of the Melbourne Football Club and the Melbourne Cricket Club
John Mitchell (American football coach) (born 1951), coach and 1st African-American to play football for University of Alabama
John Mitchell (Australian footballer) (1891–1962), Australian rules footballer for South Melbourne
John Mitchell (cricketer) (born 1947), New Zealand cricketer
John Mitchell (footballer, born 1800s) (fl. 1879–1891), footballer for Doncaster Rovers, Newton Heath and Bolton Wanderers
John Mitchell (footballer, born 1952), English footballer
John Mitchell (hurler) (born 1946), Irish retired hurler and manager
John Mitchell (rugby union) (born 1964), rugby player and coach
John T. Mitchell (1854–1914), whist and bridge player
Johnny Mitchell (born 1971), American football tight end

Others
John Mitchell (historian) (1941–2021), New Zealand historian
John Murray Mitchell (missionary) (1815–1904), Scottish missionary and orientalist
John Mitchell (Being Human), a character in the television series Being Human
SS John Mitchell (1906), an American lake freighter
SS John Mitchell (1942), a Liberty ship

See also
Jon Mitchell (disambiguation)
John Michel (disambiguation)
John Michell (disambiguation)
John Mitchels (disambiguation)
Jack Mitchell (disambiguation)
Jackie Mitchell (disambiguation)
Jonathan Mitchell (disambiguation)
Joni Mitchell (born 1943), Canadian singer-songwriter and artist